Acontias parietalis, the Maputaland legless skink, is a species of lizard in the family Scincidae. It is found in Zimbabwe, Mozambique, and Botswana.

References

Acontias
Reptiles described in 1990
Taxa named by Donald George Broadley